The Australian Hard Court Championships was a former professional tennis tournament established in 1938 and held until 2008. The event was played on clay courts until 1977 when it switched to hard courts. The tournament was a combined event for men and women until the end of the 1980s. In 2009, Tennis Australia merged the separate men's and women's tournaments into a new combined tournament called the Brisbane International.

History

Men's event
The Australian Men's Hard Court Championships began in Sydney in 1938. Throughout its history the championships were hosted in various cities around Australia. The tournament was played on clay until 1977. In 1978 the event switched to hardcourts and continued to be played on that surface until 1987. In the years 1987 and 1988, the tournament was held in conjunction with the South Australian Open. Between 1999 and 2004, the national title was held in conjunction with the AAPT Championships. In 2005, the tournament was held in conjunction with the Adelaide Next Generation Hard Courts. From 2006 until 2008, the tournament was held in conjunction with the Adelaide Next Generation International. In 2008, the tournament in Adelaide was discontinued and merged with the women's event into a new combined tournament called the Brisbane International.

Women's event
The Australian Women's Hard Court Championships event began alongside the men's in Sydney in 1938 and was also hosted in various cities around Australia throughout its history. The tournament was played on clay courts until 1977. In 1978 the event switched to hardcourts and continued to be played on that surface till 1987. Between 1989 and 1994, the event was held in conjunction with the Danone Australian Hardcourt Championships. It was not staged in 1995 and 1996, but re-emerged as a women's only event called the Thalgo Australian Women's Hard Courts which was held until 2002. In 2003, the tournament took the sponsorship of Uncle Tobys, and was named Uncle Tobys Hardcourts until 2005. Between 2006 and 2008, it was held as the Mondial Australian Women's Hardcourts. In 2009 the tournament was discontinued and was merged with the men's event into a new combined tournament called the Brisbane International.

Sponsors
Sponsors for the men's event included Eurovox and Goldair. Sponsors for the women's event included Danone, Uncle Tobys, Mondial, and Thalgo.

Past finals
Past finals of the championship's events include:

Men's singles

Women's singles

Men's doubles

Women's doubles

See also
 South Australian Championships
 Brisbane International

Notes
Notes 1: From inception in 1938 the men's and women's events of the championships were hosted at the same locations and venues for most of its duration until 1986. Though there were a few exceptions after 1986, the name of the event- the (national title)- remained but the tournaments were separated into individual events for men and women until 2008.
 Notes 2: As early as 1949, the (national championships) were occasionally held in conjunction with other tournaments which has been the case in more recent times.

References

Sources
 Australian Hard Court Championships: Roll of Honour: Tournament draws

External links
 

ATP Tour
WTA Tour
Grand Prix tennis circuit
Clay court tennis tournaments
Hard court tennis tournaments
Sports competitions in Adelaide
Sports competitions in Brisbane
Sports competitions in Melbourne
Sports competitions in Sydney
1938 establishments in Australia
2008 disestablishments in Australia
Defunct tennis tournaments in Australia